Eunephrops manningi, the banded lobster, is a species of lobster found in the West Indies. It was named in 1974 by carcinologist Lipke Holthuis after his friend  and fellow carcinologist Raymond B. Manning.

Description
While it is large enough to be a target for commercial lobster fishing, this is precluded by its rarity, only three specimens having ever been collected. It can be distinguished from other species in the genus by the lack of post-cervical spines on the carapace, and by the presence of only transverse grooves on the body segments of the abdomen.

References

True lobsters
Crustaceans of the Atlantic Ocean
Crustaceans described in 1974
Arthropods of the Dominican Republic